Daniele Vargas, stage name of Daniele Pitani (20 April 1922 – 7 January 1981) was an Italian film actor.

Life and career 
Born in Imola, a small town in the district of Bologna, after attending high school with Pier Paolo Pasolini, Daniele Vargas enrolled in the Faculty of Medicine of Bologna University. After graduation in 1957 he moved to Rome to follow his passion for cinema.

He began to appear in small roles in costume films and sword-and-sandals at the end of the 1950s and rapidly became one of the most active character actors, specializing in villain roles and sometime in characters of Spanish language.

Selected filmography 

 Hercules Unchained (1959) - Amphiaraus
 Non perdiamo la testa (1959) - The Butler
 Le cameriere (1959) - Il baritono Marini
 Caltiki – The Immortal Monster (1959) - Bob
 The Pirate and the Slave Girl (1959) - Gamal
 The Giant of Marathon (1959) - Darius I, King of Persia
 La strada dei giganti (1960)
 Fury of the Pagans (1960) - Napur
 The Thief of Bagdad (1961) - Gamal
 Totò, Peppino e... la dolce vita (1961) - Marchese Daniele
 A Difficult Life (1961) - Marquis Capperoni
 Sodom and Gomorrah (1962) - Segur
 March on Rome (1962) - "Sua Excelencia"
 The Invincible Masked Rider (1963) - Don Luis
 Torpedo Bay (1963) - Brauzzi
 Samson and the Sea Beast (1963) - Murad
 Il Successo (1963) - Il principale di Laura
 I mostri (1963) - Professor Pinzuto (segment "I due Orfanelli")
 Terror of the Steppes (1964) - Altan Khan
 La calda vita (1964)
 Panic Button (1964)
 Hercules Against Rome (1964) - Filippo Afro
 The Revenge of Spartacus (1964) - Lucius Transone
 Hercules and the Tyrants of Babylon (1964)
 Ces dames s'en mêlent (1965) - Zacharoff
 Jungle Adventurer (1965) - Rajah Sindar
 Goliath at the Conquest of Damascus (1965) - Saud
 Up and Down (1965) - Il professor Maestrelli (segment "Questione di Principo")
 La Dama de Beirut (1965)
 Se non avessi più te (1965) - Hotel Manager in Barcelona
 Degueyo (1966) - Frank
 Seasons of Our Love (1966) - Count Della Pica
 A Man Could Get Killed (1966) - Osman
 Kiss Kiss...Bang Bang (1966) - Tol Lim
 The Spy Who Loved Flowers (1966) - Stan Harriman
 Web of Violence (1966) - Lo Vecchio
 After the Fox (1966) - Prosecuting Counsel
 Pleasant Nights (1966) - Fortebraccio da Montone
 Wanted (1967) - Gold - Mayor
 Per amore... per magia... (1967)
 The Long, the Short, the Cat (1967) - Ispettore americano
 Return of Django (1967) - Clay Ferguson
 Come rubare un quintale di diamanti in Russia (1967) - Zak
 Electra One (1967) - Electra 1
 Golden Chameleon (1967)
 Assault on the State Treasure (1967) - Kaufman
 The Last Killer (1967) - John Barrett
 The Stranger Returns (1967) - Good Jim
 Vengeance Is My Forgiveness (1968) - Doctor Frank Decker
 Spirits of the Dead (1968) - University professor (segment "William Wilson")
 Madigan's Millions (1968) - Giovanni Casetti (italian version)
 Cemetery Without Crosses (1969) - Will Rogers
 Zorro in the Court of England (1970) - Sir Basil Ruthford
 Bridge Over the Elbe (1969) - Major
 Zorro, the Navarra Marquis (1969) - Col. Brizard
 Poppea's Hot Nights (1969) - Druso
 Eros e Thanatos (1969)
The President of Borgorosso Football Club (1970) - Don Ragazzoni
 Four Gunmen of the Holy Trinity (1971) - Thompson
 Riuscirà il nostro eroe a ritrovare il più grande diamante del mondo? (1971) - Dolmann
 The Devil Has Seven Faces (1971) - James Marlowe
 Il terrore con gli occhi storti (1972) - José
 Il generale dorme in piedi (1972) - Ten. Col. Poli
 Zambo il dominatore della foresta (1972) - Perkins
 I Kiss the Hand (1973) - Don Santino Bileggi
 Those Dirty Dogs (1973) - Major, Fort Apache Commander
 The Arena (1974) - Timarchus
 Playing the Field (1974) - The President
 The Voyage (1974) - Don Liborio, Lawyer
 Silence the Witness (1974) - Il senatore Turrisi
 Ante Up (1974) - Avvocato
 La nipote (1974) - Luigi / Husband
 Eyeball (1975) - Robby Alvarado
 The Sensuous Nurse (1975) - Gustavo Scarpa
 Quella provincia maliziosa (1975)
 L'ingenua (1975) - Luigi Beton
 Oh, Serafina! (1976) - Assessore Buglio
 Sex with a Smile II (1976) - Avv. Augusto Zenaro (segment "La visita")
 Il signor Ministro li pretese tutti e subito (1977) - Luigi Romagnoli
 Three Tigers Against Three Tigers (1977) - Berchielli capo di scorza
 Being Twenty (1978) - Affatati
 Where Are You Going on Holiday? (1978) - Cavalier Ciccio Colombi (segment "Sì buana")
 ...And Give Us Our Daily Sex (1979) - Oculista (as Danielle Vargas)
 Una donna di notte (1979) - Publisher
 Saturday, Sunday and Friday (1979) - Il direttore (segment "Sabato")
 Io zombo, tu zombi, lei zomba (1979)
 Atsalut pader (1979)
 Il ladrone (1980) - Ruffo
 Il lupo e l'agnello (1980) - Colonello De Luca
 Spaghetti a mezzanotte (1981) - Ulderico
 Ski Mistress (1981) - Emir Hussein
 Prickly Pears (1981)
 Accadde a Parma (1988) - (final film role)

References

External links 
 

Italian male film actors
1922 births
Actors from Bologna
1992 deaths
Male Spaghetti Western actors
University of Bologna alumni
20th-century Italian male actors